Pål Børnick (born 3 November 1955) is a Norwegian competition rower and twice World Champion.

He received a silver medal in lightweight coxless fours at the 1976 World Rowing Championships in Villach, Austria. The team consisted of Edd Hillstad, Per Arvid Steen, Ivar Sølberg and Børnick.

Børnick won a gold medal in lightweight double sculls at the 1978 FISA Lightweight Championships in Copenhagen, together with Arne Gilje. While the main championship was held in Cambridge, New Zealand, the lightweight championship was held in Copenhagen, Denmark.

Gilje and Børnick won a second gold medal at the 1979 World Championships in Lake Bled, Yugoslavia.

He resides at Geilo.

References

1955 births
Living people
Norwegian male rowers
World Rowing Championships medalists for Norway